The pale Usisya aulonocara (Aulonocara steveni) is a putative species of haplochromine cichlid endemic to Lake Malawi.

It is endemic to Malawi.  Its natural habitat is freshwater lakes. This species is treated as junior synonym of Aulonocara stuartgranti by the IUCN and the Catalog of Fishes, but FishBase treat it as a valid species.

References

steveni
Fish of Lake Malawi
Fish of Malawi
Fish described in 1987
Taxa named by Manfred K. Meyer
Taxa named by Rüdiger Riehl
Taxa named by Horst Zetzsche
Taxonomy articles created by Polbot
Taxobox binomials not recognized by IUCN